Al Punto (To the Point) is a Sunday morning talk show hosted by Noticiero Univision anchor Jorge Ramos on the Univision network. Until 2012, when Enfoque premiered on Telemundo, it was the only show of its type in the United States that broadcast in the Spanish language.

History 
Al Punto debuted on Univision on September 9, 2007 to coincide with the first Spanish language U.S. Presidential Debate hosted by Univision at the University of Miami on the same date. The show's first guests were then Republican National Committee Chairman and Florida Senator Mel Martinez and New Jersey Senator Bob Menendez.

Content
Al Punto consists of a variety of interviews on issues of importance to the Latin community in the United States.

References

External links 
Univision Official Site
Al Punto Official Site

2007 American television series debuts
2000s American television talk shows
2010s American television talk shows
2000s American television news shows
2010s American television news shows
Univision original programming
 
American Sunday morning talk shows